Coyame del Sotol is one of the 67 municipalities of Chihuahua, in northern Mexico. The municipal seat is Coyame.

As of the 2010 census, the municipality had a total population of 1,681.

The municipality had 232 localities, none of which had a population over 1,000.

Name
"Coyame" is the Apache toponym of a nearby arroyo.
"Sotol" is the local name for Dasylirion wheeleri, a flowering desert plant, and for sotol, a distilled mezcal-like spirit made from it.

Geography

Towns and villages
The municipality has 46 localities. These are the largest:

Adjacent municipalities
 Ojinaga Municipality – east
 Aldama Municipality – south, southwest
 Ahumada Municipality – northwest
 Guadalupe Municipality – north

References

Municipalities of Chihuahua (state)